Kuhgir Rural District is a rural district (dehestan) in Tarom Sofla District, Qazvin County, Qazvin Province, Iran. At the 2006 census, its population was 2,873, in 734 families.  The rural district has 18 villages.

References 

Rural Districts of Qazvin Province
Qazvin County